Markus Antonius Rogan (born 4 May 1982 in Vienna) is a retired Austrian swimmer, who won two silver medals at the 2004 Summer Olympics in Athens, Greece and a gold medal for 200 m backstroke at the 2008 World Short Course Championships in Manchester. He also was the world record holder in 200 metres backstroke (short course) in that year.

Rogan's first big international success was a second-place finish in the 200 m backstroke at the 2001 World Championships in Fukuoka, Japan.

In the Olympics in 2004, Rogan placed second in both men's 100 m backstroke and the men's 200 m backstroke, both times behind Aaron Peirsol of the United States. The 200 metre race was controversial as Peirsol was first disqualified but later reinstated as gold medalist. Rogan told Peirsol on television that the result was unfair and that Peirsol should protest.

As a teenager, the 6 ft 5 in tall Rogan swam for Mount Vernon High School in Fairfax County, Virginia, where he trained with the Curl-Burke Swim Club.  In July 2000, he cut short his final season of the Northern Virginia Swim League, swimming for the Mansion House Piranhas (of Mount Vernon). He flew to Australia and competed in the 2000 Sydney Olympics, failing to advance beyond the heats in the backstroke.

He earned a scholarship to attend Stanford University from 2000 to 2004. On 8 December 2005, in Trieste, Rogan set a new world record in the 200 m backstroke for short course swim pools, with 1:50.43. This world record was later broken by American swimmer Ryan Lochte. Back on the short course in Short Course World Championships in Manchester, Rogan broke the world record again on 13 April 2008, in a time of 1:47.84, with Lochte finishing second by seven one-hundredths of a second (also under the old world record). Both swimmers were wearing the new Speedo LZR Racer swimsuit.

At the 2008 European Championships in Eindoven, The Netherlands, in March 2008, Rogan told reporters that he was planning to retire after the Beijing Olympics in August. He won both the 100 and 200 metre backstroke events (long course) at those European Championships.

In the meantime, Rogan changed his plans on retirement. He swam at the World Championships in 2009 in Rome. He was training in Italy and wanted to enjoy the home event with his Italian training partners.

At the 2010 European championships he won silver in the 200 m IM behind Olympic Silver medalist László Cseh. Rogan competed in his last Olympic games in London in 2012.

He is now a psychologist working with athletes. He was the director of performance psychology for the Brazilian Olympic Team in Rio de Janeiro, 2016.

He is married to Leanne Cobb, a marketing executive who was born in South Africa. They live together in Los Angeles, California.

See also
 World record progression 200 metres backstroke

References

External links 

 
 
 

1982 births
Living people
Austrian male backstroke swimmers
Olympic swimmers of Austria
Olympic silver medalists for Austria
Male medley swimmers
Male backstroke swimmers
Stanford Cardinal men's swimmers
Swimmers at the 2000 Summer Olympics
Swimmers at the 2004 Summer Olympics
Swimmers at the 2008 Summer Olympics
Swimmers at the 2012 Summer Olympics
World record setters in swimming
World Aquatics Championships medalists in swimming
Swimmers from Vienna
Medalists at the FINA World Swimming Championships (25 m)
European Aquatics Championships medalists in swimming
Converts to Judaism
Medalists at the 2004 Summer Olympics
Olympic silver medalists in swimming
Universiade medalists in swimming
Universiade gold medalists for Austria
Universiade silver medalists for Austria
Universiade bronze medalists for Austria
Medalists at the 2005 Summer Universiade
Medalists at the 2007 Summer Universiade